Don Crawley, known professionally as Don C, is an American luxury streetwear designer from Chicago, Illinois. His family comes from Louisiana.

Crawley was previously the manager of Kanye West, and an executive at Kanye West's G.O.O.D. Music label. Don C has gotten a shoutout in multiple of Kanye West songs: “Erase Me” (Kid Cudi), “Keep My Spirit Alive”, "I Am A God" and “Facts”. After getting in trouble with the paparazzi, Don C was eventually set on fashion.

In 2011, he founded of the street-wear and sports apparel brand Just Don.  He also owns a luxury clothing store chain, RSVP Gallery with Virgil Abloh.

Personal life 
He is of Louisiana Creole descent.

Collaborations 
Don C first collaborated with Jordan in January 2015, redesigning the Jordan 2 with a blue quilted design. This design took off and gave both Nike and Don C much attention. For one of Don C's most recent collaborations, in May 2017, he created a Jordan 2 in Arctic Orange exclusively for women, children, and babies with the theme "Family First". Don C did eventually make a men's size to include everyone.

In 2018, Don C also collaborated with LVMH's Rémy Martin brand with "Just Rémy - The Rémy Martin 1738 Limited Edition".

Much of the clothes of the Just Don brand is designed with sports logos such as teams from NBA, NHL and MLS. One thing that Just Don is known for, is his hats. He designs NBA, NHL and MLS hats. These hats are popular among celebrities notably Jay-Z.

Arrest 
Don C and Kanye West were arrested in 2008 for getting into a fight with the paparazzi at LAX, where they ended up breaking a camera. They were charged with vandalism, grand theft and battery. Both were sentenced to 50 hours of community service. If they had been convicted, they could have ended up in jail and served sentence up to 5 years.

References 

American fashion designers
Year of birth missing (living people)
Living people
Artists from Chicago
Businesspeople from Chicago